Kremmen: The Movie is a 1980 science fiction comedy film written and produced in Great Britain, starring comedian Kenny Everett. The film itself is centred on Everett's sci-fi character, Captain Kremmen, a pastiche of Dan Dare.

Plot
After a whole eon, Kremmen has been awarded The Most Fabulous Man in the World Apart from God Award, and is presented with an enormous, fully automated spaceship shaped like a Brain. While Dr. Gitfinger examines the controls, Carla persuades Kremmen to have casual sex with her in their private quarters.

On Earth, the United Nations, along with David Frost, hold a secret meeting concerning an unknown matter and decide to alert Kremmen, who is now watching a documentary-film about trawler fishing in the North Sea with Carla. They return to Earth and go to meet the homosexual Head of Universal Security, simply named "Q", who informs Kremmen that planets are disappearing.

Along with their new robot Benny, Kremmen and the crew follow what appears to be a giant space-monster (who is apparently eating the planets) into the Snoop Galaxy, where the ship is swallowed whole by the monster. By pumping the Oxygen reserves into the monster's stomach, the ship is vomited out of the stomach and the crew are saved.

Errors
Throughout Everett's previous history with the Kremmen series, Gitfinger was named fully as Dr. Heinrich von Gitfinger. In this, he is named Wolfgang Amadeus Gitfinger (as a play on Wolfgang Amadeus Mozart)
The ship's voice changes halfway through the film for an unknown reason
The monster is never actually defeated, and the fate of the already-consumed planets is not revealed
The colour of Q's dress suddenly changes from red to yellow to green throughout his monologue.

Reaction
Having been used to the animation of Cosgrove Hall Films, few fans warmed up to the crude animation (provided by Norwood Studios in Leeds), and the continuous references to its thin plotline became monotonous after a while. The film had a limited release to UK cinemas as a “short” to be shown before a main feature, but was mainly distributed as a video, accompanied by 30 minutes of dance routines by Hot Gossip. Like Everett's other film, Bloodbath at the House of Death, it is unavailable in the United States.

Characters
All characters depicted are played by Kenny Everett:

Captain Kremmen
Carla
Dr. Gitfinger

The above three are the only characters to have appeared in the TV series who appear in the film. Below are characters completely new to the Kremmen series:

Sam the Stoolie (A sentient stool in a bar, Kremmen's undercover contact)
Benny the Hunchbacked Robot
Ship (The personality of Kremmen's new ship)
Q (The homosexual Head of Universal Security)
Arnie "I once played a club on The Moon but there was no Atmosphere" Schwarz (A robotic TV presenter)

See also
Captain Kremmen - The eponymous hero of the film
Kenny Everett - The creator of the former

External links
Kremmen: The Movie at the Big Cartoon DataBase

1980 direct-to-video films
1980 films
British science fiction films
1980s English-language films
1980s British films